Comparison of the Java and .NET platforms.

Legal issues

.NET
The Mono project aims to avoid infringing on any patents or copyrights and, to the extent that they are successful, the project can be safely distributed and used under the GPL. On November 2, 2006, Microsoft and Novell announced a joint agreement whereby Microsoft promised not to sue Novell or its customers for patent infringement. According to a statement on the blog of Mono project leader Miguel de Icaza, this agreement only extends to Mono for Novell developers and users. Because of the possible threat of Microsoft patents, the FSF recommends that people avoid creating software that depends on Mono or C#.

The Microsoft–Novell agreement was criticized by some in the open source community because it violates the principles of giving equal rights to all users of a particular program (see Agreement with Microsoft and Mono and Microsoft's patents).

In response to the Microsoft–Novell agreement, the Free Software Foundation revised its GNU General Public License to close the loophole used by Microsoft and Novell to bypass the GPL's very strong and protective provisions on patent deals (considered by Microsoft as restrictive). The FSF also stated that by selling coupons for Novell's Linux software, the mechanism by which Microsoft circumvented the GNU license, it considers Microsoft to be a Linux vendor, and thereby subject to the full terms and conditions laid out in the GPL.

The .NET landscape started to change in 2013, when Microsoft decided to open-source many of its core .NET technologies under Apache License, with even more donated to newly formed .NET Foundation in 2014. Open-sourced technologies include ASP.NET MVC, Entity Framework, Managed Extensibility Framework, Roslyn compiler-as-a-service infrastructure (together with C# and Visual Basic .NET compilers), F# functional-first language compiler, and many more. Microsoft and Xamarin announced collaboration, with the intent to increase cross-platform availability of .NET on Mac OS, Linux, and mobile devices.

Microsoft released in June 2016 .NET Core 1.0, which is an open-source cross-platform environment and a lean version of the pure Windows implementation.

Traditional computer applications

Desktop applications
Although Java's AWT (Abstract Window Toolkit) and Swing libraries are not shy of features, Java has struggled to establish a foothold in the desktop market. Sun Microsystems was also slow, in the eyes of some, to promote Java to developers and end-users in a way that makes it an appealing choice for desktop software. Even technologies such as Java Web Start, which have few parallels within rival languages and platforms, have barely been promoted.

The release of Java version 6.0 on December 11, 2006, saw a renewed focus on the desktop market with an extensive set of new tools for closer integration with the desktop. At the 2007 JavaOne conference Sun made further desktop related announcements, including a new language aimed at taking on Adobe Flash (JavaFX), a new lightweight way of downloading the JRE that sees the initial footprint reduced to under 2 Mb, and a renewed focus on multimedia libraries.

An alternative to AWT and Swing is the Standard Widget Toolkit (SWT), which was originally developed by IBM and now maintained by the Eclipse Foundation. It attempts to achieve improved performance and visualization of Java desktop applications by relying on underlying native libraries where possible.

On Windows, Microsoft's .NET is a popular desktop development providing both Windows Forms (a lightweight wrapper around the Win32 API), Windows Presentation Foundation, and Silverlight. With the integration of .NET into the Windows platform, .NET apps are first class citizens in the Windows environment with tighter OS integration and native look and feel compared to Java's Swing.

Outside of Windows, Silverlight is portable to the Mac OS X desktop. Mono is also becoming more common in open-source and free software systems due to its inclusion on many Linux desktop environments.

Server applications
This is probably the arena in which the two platforms are closest to being considered rivals. Java, through its Java EE (a.k.a. Java Platform Enterprise Edition) platform, and .NET through ASP.NET, compete to create web-based dynamic content and applications.

Both platforms are well used and supported in this market. Of the top 1,000 websites, approximately 24% use ASP.NET and also 24% use Java, whereas of all the websites approximately 17% use ASP.NET and 3% use Java.

Some of Oracle's Java-related license agreements for Java EE define aspects of the Java platform as a trade secret, and prohibit the end user from contributing to a third-party Java environment. Specifically, at least one current license for an Oracle Java EE development package contains the following terms: "You may make a single archival copy of Software, but otherwise may not copy, modify, or distribute Software." — "Unless enforcement is prohibited by applicable law, you may not decompile, or reverse engineer Software." — "You may not publish or provide the results of any benchmark or comparison tests run on Software to any third party without the prior written consent of Oracle." — "Software is confidential and copyrighted." However, while Oracle's software is subject to the above license terms, Oracle's Java EE API reference has been implemented under an open-source license by the WildFly (originally JBoss) and JOnAS projects.

Microsoft's implementation of ASP.NET is not part of the standardized CLI and, while Microsoft's runtime environment and development tools are not subject to comparable secrecy agreements to Java EE, the official Microsoft tools are not open source or free software, and require Windows servers. However, a cross-platform free software ASP.NET implementation is part of the Mono project (minus Web Parts and Web Services Enhancements). Mono supports ASP.NET 4.0 including Web Forms, Microsoft AJAX, and ASP.NET MVC.

Embedded applications

Mobile applications
Google's popular Android platform for mobile application is based on Java. Google adopted a customised virtual machine called Dalvik to optimise the execution of Java code for mobile devices.

Oracle provides Java ME; a reference implementation for mobile OEM vendors. Java ME is made up of various profiles that are subsets of the Java desktop environment with additional libraries targeted at mobile and set-top-box development. Java ME has a very large base within the mobile phone and PDA markets, with only the cheapest devices now devoid of a KVM (a cut-down JVM for use on devices with limited processing power). Java software, including many games, is commonplace.

While many feature phones include a JVM, they are not always heavily used by users (particularly in South Africa). Initially Java applications on most phones typically consisted of menuing systems, small games, or systems to download ringtones etc. However, more-powerful phones are increasingly being sold with simple applications pre-loaded, such as translation dictionaries, world clock displays (darkness/light, time zones, etc.), and calculators. Some of these are written in Java, although how often phone owners actually use them is probably unknown. 

Microsoft currently ships the .NET Compact Framework that runs on Windows CE and mobile devices, set-top boxes, and PDAs as well as the Xbox 360. Microsoft also provides the .NET Micro Framework for embedded developers with limited resources.

Alternatively, Novell licenses embeddable versions of Mono to third parties to use in their devices, and Xamarin commercially distributes the MonoDroid and MonoTouch framework for Android and iPhone development, respectively.

Windows Phone 7 uses Silverlight for native apps, but Windows Phone 8 has C# and XAML as the main languages.

Home entertainment technologies
Java has found a market in digital television, where it can be used to provide software that sits alongside programming, or extends the capabilities of a given set-top box. TiVo, for example, has a facility called "Home Media Engine", which allows Java TV software to be transmitted to an appropriate TiVo device to complement programming or provide extra functionality (for example, personalized stock tickers on a business news program).

A variant of Java has been accepted as the official software tool for use on the next generation optical disc technology Blu-ray, via the BD-J interactive platform. This will mean that interactive content, such as menus, games, downloadables, etc. on all Blu-ray optical discs will be created under a variant of the Java platform.

Rather than using Java, HD DVD (the defunct high-definition successor to DVD) used a technology jointly developed by Microsoft and Disney called HDi that was based on XML, CSS, JavaScript, and other technologies that are comparable to those used by standard web browsers.

The BD-J platform API is more extensive than its iHD rival, with an alleged 8,000 methods and interfaces, as opposed to iHD's 400. And while Microsoft is pushing iHD's XML presentation layer by including it with Windows Vista, iHD is still a newcomer in a market sector where Java technologies are already commonplace.

However, the fact that the HD DVD format has been abandoned in favor of Blu-ray means that HDi is no longer supported on any optical disc format, making the BD-J format a clear winner.

Runtime inclusion in operating systems

.NET/Mono
On Windows, Microsoft has promoted .NET as its flagship development platform by including the .NET runtime in Windows XP Service Pack 2 and 3, Windows Server 2003, Windows Vista, Windows Server 2008 and Windows 7. Microsoft also distributes the Visual Studio Express development environment at no cost, and the Visual Studio Community development environment at no cost, with limited use for organizations.

.NET Framework 3.5 runtime is not pre-installed on versions of Windows prior to Vista SP1, and must be downloaded by the user, which has been criticized because of its large size (65 MB download for .NET 3.5).

While neither .NET nor Mono are installed with Mac OS X out-of-the-box, the Mono project can be downloaded and installed separately, for free, for any Mac user who wants to build or run C# and .NET software. As of 13 May 2008, Mono's System.WindowsForms 2.0 is API-complete (contains 100% of classes, methods etc. in Microsoft's System.WindowsForms 2.0); also System.WindowsForms 2.0 works natively on Mac OS X.

C# and the CLI are included and used in a number of Linux- and BSD-based operating systems by way of including the free software Mono Project.

As a result of inclusion of .NET or Mono runtimes in the distributions of Windows and Linux, non-GUI applications that use the programming interfaces that are common to both .NET and Mono can be developed in C# or any other .NET language and then deployed across many operating systems and processor architectures using a runtime environment that is available as a part of the operating system's installation. Both Microsoft .NET and the Mono project have complete support for the Ecma- and ISO-standardized C# language and .NET runtime, and many of Microsoft's non-standardized .NET programming interfaces have been implemented or are under development in Mono, but each environment includes many components that have not been implemented in the other.

Java
No current version of Windows ships with Java; they stopped shipping with Windows XP SP1a.

Java was pre-installed on all new Apple computers beginning with Mac OS X 10.0 and ending with 10.6, after which Java 6 became an optional Apple download. Java 7 and later releases are provided by Oracle.

Java comes pre-installed with many commercial Unix flavors, including those from Hewlett Packard, IBM, and Oracle. As of June 2009, the Debian, Fedora 9, Mandriva, OpenSUSE, Slackware extra, and Ubuntu 8.04 distributions are available with OpenJDK, based completely on free and open-source code. Since June 2008, OpenJDK passed all of the compatibility tests in the Java SE 6 JCK and can claim to be a fully compatible Java 6 implementation. OpenJDK can run complex applications such as Eclipse, GlassFish, WildFly, or Netbeans.

The Operating System Distributor License for Java (DLJ) was a Sun initiative to ease distribution issues with operating systems based on Linux or OpenSolaris.

If Java is not installed on a computer by default, it may be downloaded by the user as a Web plugin. The Web plugin process has been criticized because of the size of the Java plugin. Unlike other plugins, the Java download is a full runtime environment capable of running not just applets, but full applications and dynamic WebStart apps. Because of this, the perceived download footprint is larger than some web plugins. However, compared to Java, other popular browser plugins have larger sizes: Java 6 JRE is 13 MB, but Acrobat Reader is 33 MB, QuickTime 19 MB, Windows Media Player 25 MB, the .NET Framework 3.0 runtime is 54 MB, and the .NET Framework 3.5 runtime is 197 MB (it's a united package for x86, x64, and IA-64; each part has approximately 60 MB).

At the JavaOne event in May 2007, Sun announced that the deployment issues with Java would be solved in two major updates during the lifespan of Java 6 (the changes will not be held over to Java 7.) These include:
The introduction of a new consumer JRE edition, with an initial 2 Mb footprint and the ability to download the remaining 9 Mb in sections using an on-demand methodology.
The development of drop-in cross-platform JavaScript code, which can be used from a Web page to install the necessary JRE for a given applet or Rich Internet Application to run, if necessary.
An improvement in support for automatically downloading updates to the JRE.
support for pre-loading of the JRE, so applets and applications written in Java start up almost instantaneously.

See also
Comparison of C# and Java languages
Java programming language

References

External links
Moving to C# and the .NET Framework at MSDN
ECMA-335 Common Language Infrastructure (CLI), 4th edition (June 2006) - free download of Ecma CLI standard
ISO/IEC 23271:2006 Common Language Infrastructure (CLI) Partitions I to VI - the official ISO/IEC CLI standard

.NET
Java (programming language)
Java and .NET platforms